Catoptria is a genus of moths of the family Crambidae.

Species

Catoptria acutangulellus (Herrich-Schäffer, 1847)
Catoptria algeriensis (Müller-Rutz, 1931)
Catoptria amathusia Bleszynski, 1965
Catoptria aurora Bleszynski, 1965
Catoptria biformellus (Rebel, 1893)
Catoptria bolivari (Agenjo, 1947)
Catoptria brachyrhabda (Hampson in Elwes, Hampson & Durrant, 1906)
Catoptria cabardinica Bolov, 1999
Catoptria captiva Bassi, 1999
Catoptria casalei Bassi, 1999
Catoptria casperella Ganev, 1983
Catoptria caucasicus (Alphéraky, 1876)
Catoptria ciliciella (Rebel, 1893)
Catoptria colchicellus (Lederer, 1870)
Catoptria combinella (Denis & Schiffermüller, 1775)
Catoptria conchella (Denis & Schiffermüller, 1775)
Catoptria confusellus (Staudinger, 1881)
Catoptria corsicellus (Duponchel, 1837)
Catoptria daghestanica Bleszynski, 1965
Catoptria digitellus (Herrich-Schäffer, 1849)
Catoptria dimorphellus (Staudinger, 1881)
Catoptria domaviellus (Rebel, 1904)
Catoptria emiliae Savenkov, 1984
Catoptria europaeica Bleszynski, 1965
Catoptria falsella (Denis & Schiffermüller, 1775)
Catoptria fenestratellus (Caradja, 1928)
Catoptria fibigeri Ganev, 1987
Catoptria fulgidella (Hübner, 1813)
Catoptria furcatellus (Zetterstedt, 1839)
Catoptria furciferalis (Hampson, 1900)
Catoptria gozmanyi Bleszynski, 1956
Catoptria hannemanni Alberti, 1967
Catoptria harutai Okano, 1958
Catoptria hilarellus (Caradja, 1925)
Catoptria incertellus (Herrich-Schäffer, 1848)
Catoptria inouella Bleszynski, 1965
Catoptria kasyi Bleszynski, 1960
Catoptria laevigatellus (Lederer, 1870)
Catoptria languidellus (Zeller, 1863)
Catoptria latiradiellus (Walker, 1863)
Catoptria luctiferella (Hübner, 1813)
Catoptria lythargyrella (Hübner, 1796)
Catoptria maculalis (Zetterstedt, 1839)
Catoptria majorellus (Drenowski, 1925)
Catoptria margaritella (Denis & Schiffermüller, 1775)
Catoptria mediofasciella (Zerny, 1914)
Catoptria mienshani Bleszynski, 1965
Catoptria montivaga (Inoue, 1955)
Catoptria munroeella Bleszynski, 1965
Catoptria myella (Hübner, 1796)
Catoptria mytilella (Hübner, 1805)
Catoptria nana Okano, 1959
Catoptria olympica Ganev, 1983
Catoptria oregonicus (Grote, 1880)
Catoptria orientellus (Herrich-Schäffer, 1850)
Catoptria orobiella Huemer & Tarmann, 1993
Catoptria osthelderi (Lattin, 1950)
Catoptria pandora Bleszynski, 1965
Catoptria pauperellus (Treitschke, 1832)
Catoptria permiacus (W. Petersen, 1924)
Catoptria permutatellus (Herrich-Schäffer, 1848)
Catoptria persephone Bleszynski, 1965
Catoptria petrificella (Hübner, 1796)
Catoptria pfeifferi (Osthelder, 1938)
Catoptria pinella (Linnaeus, 1758)
Catoptria profluxella (Christoph in Romanoff, 1887)
Catoptria pyramidellus (Treitschke, 1832)
Catoptria radiella (Hübner, 1813)
 Catoptria radiella intermediellus Müller-Rutz, 1920
 Catoptria radiella radiella Hübner, 1813
Catoptria satakei (Okano, 1962)
Catoptria siliciellus Rebel, 1891
Catoptria spatulelloides Bleszynski, 1965
Catoptria spatulellus (Turati, 1919)
Catoptria speculalis Hübner, 1825
Catoptria spodiellus (Rebel, 1916)
Catoptria staudingeri (Zeller, 1863)
Catoptria submontivaga Bleszynski, 1965
Catoptria thibetica Bleszynski, 1965
Catoptria trichostomus (Christoph, 1858)
Catoptria verellus (Zincken, 1817)
Catoptria viridiana Bleszynski, 1965
Catoptria witimella Bleszynski, 1965
Catoptria xerxes (Sauber, 1904)
Catoptria zermattensis (Frey, 1870)

References

External links
 

Crambini
Crambidae genera
Taxa named by Jacob Hübner